Harry Weld-Forester (born 5 May 1981) was a Scottish cricketer. He was a right-handed batsman and a leg-break bowler who played for Manicaland. He was born in Glasgow.

Weld-Forester made a single first-class appearance for the side, though he neither batted or bowled for the side, and made just a single catch in the outfield.

External links
Harry Weld-Forester at Cricket Archive 

1981 births
Scottish cricketers
Living people
Manicaland cricketers
Cricketers from Glasgow